Melinda Caroll (born April 4, 1952, Jacksonville, Florida) is a singer, composer, record producer, recording artist, and lifetime Member of Girl Scouts. She has created and produced music for Girl Scouts since 1989.

One Warm Coat Project

One Warm Coat started out in 1992 as a Thanksgiving Weekend coat drive in San Francisco. Since then, more than 1 Million coats have been donated in thousands of local communities across North America. The "warm coats" theme came about when Caroll was asked by One Warm Coat to create a theme song about the charitable project.

Girl Scout Music

Caroll has performed live before hundreds of thousands of Girl Scouts and has played for distinguished guests including members of the United States Congress, Secretary of State, Colin Powell and members of the President's cabinet when her song, Every Girl, Everywhere, debuted at the Girl Scouts' 90th Birthday celebration Gala at the National Building Museum in Washington DC on March 12, 2002.

In 2012, her composition Ignite was chosen as theme song for the 100th Anniversary Celebration of Girl Scouts USA.

Caroll is a lifetime member of Girl Scouts of the U.S.A. She resides in Maui.

When We Shine 
Caroll is the artistic director of When We Shine, a non-profit network of multimedia artists. In 2018, Caroll led the children of Pōmaikaʻi Elementary School in Kahului, Hawaii through the entire process of creating a CD called Songs for Change.

Discography

Awards
 Hawaii Academy of Recording Arts (HARA) Nā Hōkū Hanohano, Best Female Vocalist 1989 for Road to Paradise

References

External links 

Girl Scouts website
Melinda Caroll Music
Hawaii-music website
One Warm Coat website
When We Shine website

American women singers
Singers from Hawaii
American women composers
21st-century American composers
Musicians from Jacksonville, Florida
1952 births
Living people
Na Hoku Hanohano Award winners
21st-century American women musicians
21st-century women composers